Hesperomyces is a genus of fungi in the family Laboulbeniaceae. The genus contains ten species, including the type species, the Green Beetle Hanger (Hesperomyces virescens). H. virescens is a complex of species. It is an ecoparasite of an invasive species to Europe and the Americas, the harlequin ladybird (Harmonia axyridis). Laboratory bioassays pointed out that Hesperomyces-infected ladybirds suffered increased mortality rates.

The fungus completes its entire life cycle on the tough outer layer or integument of a living host where individual fruiting bodies or thalli are formed directly from ascospores. The thalli can form on any part of the insect, but spore germination likely only occurs once the host cuticle has hardened. The spores are believed to have a short life span. Due to the spores' sticky nature, they are not transmitted by contact with substrate or the air. Instead they are spread directly by host activities and it is suggested that transmission occurs during feeding and mating season when sexual contact occurs, therefore making H. virescens a sexually transmitted disease of insects.

Species
Hesperomyces auriculatus 
Hesperomyces biphylli 
Hesperomyces catopii 
Hesperomyces chilomenis 
Hesperomyces coccinelloides 
Hesperomyces coleomegillae 
Hesperomyces harmoniae 
Hesperomyces hyperaspidis 
Hesperomyces palustris 
Hesperomyces papuanus 
Hesperomyces virescens

References

Laboulbeniomycetes
Laboulbeniomycetes genera
Taxa described in 1891